Team BS is the debut title album of the French hip hop collective Team BS established in 2013 by La Fouine, and that includes in addition to him, Fababy, Sultan and vocalist Sindy, the latter from the French television series Popstars where la Fouine was one of the judges. "BS" denotes actually the record label they all work in, namely Banlieue Sale founded by La Fouine.

In 2013, the collective Team BS had a debuting charting success with the self-titled single "Team BS" (alternatively known as "Vrais frères"). The release was accompanied by a music video. In January 2014, Team BS came up with a follow-up single "Case départ".

In addition to "Team BS" and "Case départ", four further tracks from the album have charted based on downloads. These are "1.2.3.", "Fierté", "Ma verité" and "Je rappe".

Track list

Charts

Weekly charts

Year-end charts

Charting singles

*Did not appear in the official Belgian Ultratop 50 charts, but rather in the bubbling under Ultratip charts.

References

2014 albums
French-language albums
Team BS albums